Saint Maximus (died 361 AD) was Bishop of Naples, who was sent into exile. Maximus was known as a great defender of the decrees of the Council of Nicaea, especially with the opposition to Arianism. This led to his exile, and being replaced as Bishop of Naples, by Zosimos, who proclaimed the Arianistic doctrine. A well known legend states that each time Zosimos wanted to speak in public, his words would not come out. Many attributed this as a miracle, through the prayers of the exiled Maximus. He would be martyred in exile.

References

361 deaths
Italian saints
4th-century Christian martyrs
4th-century Italian bishops
4th-century Romans
Bishops of Naples
Year of birth unknown